Matsutani (written: 松谷 lit. "pine tree valley") is a Japanese surname. Notable people with the surname include:

Hiroaki Matsutani (fl. 1990s), Japanese mixed martial artist
, Japanese military officer
, Japanese mixed-media artist
, ring name Shōhōzan Yūya, Japanese sumo wrestler

Fictional characters
Yoko Matsutani, from the 2000s Japanese Legendz franchise

Japanese-language surnames